Yenibağ is a village in the municipality of Qarayeri in the Samukh Rayon of Azerbaijan.

References

Populated places in Samukh District